The Institute of Workplace and Facilities Management (IWFM; formerly the British Institute of Facilities Management, BIFM) is a United Kingdom-based professional association for the facilities management sector.

History
BIFM was formed in 1993 to promote the development of facilities management as a critical, professional and strategic business discipline. In June 2018, the BIFM had around 17,000 individual members.

BIFM was a founding member of the Global Facility Management Association (Global FM), and a full member of the Construction Industry Council.

In May 2018, the BIFM proposed changing its name to the Institute of Workplace and Facilities Management and attaining chartered body status. The name change was implemented in November 2018.

See also

 List of professional associations in the United Kingdom

References

External links
 

1993 establishments in England
Organizations established in 1993
Organisations based in Hertfordshire
Professional associations based in the United Kingdom
Property management
Real estate in the United Kingdom